The Vought SB2U Vindicator is an American carrier-based dive bomber developed for the United States Navy in the 1930s, the first monoplane in this role. Vindicators still remained in service at the time of the Battle of Midway, but by 1943, all had been withdrawn to training units. It was known as the Chesapeake in Royal Navy service.

Design and development
In 1934, the United States Navy issued a requirement for a new Scout Bomber for carrier use, and received proposals from six manufacturers. The specification was issued in two parts, one for a monoplane, and one for a biplane. Vought submitted designs in both categories, which would become the XSB2U-1 and XSB3U-1 respectively. The biplane was considered alongside the monoplane design as a "hedge" against the U.S. Navy's reluctance to pursue the modern configuration.

The XSB2U-1 was of conventional low-wing  monoplane configuration with a retractable conventional tailwheel landing gear, the pilot and tail gunner being seated in tandem under a long greenhouse-style canopy. The fuselage was of steel tube construction, covered with aluminum panels from the nose to the rear cockpit with a fabric-covered rear fuselage, while the folding cantilever wing was of all-metal construction. A Pratt & Whitney R-1535 Twin-Wasp Junior radial engine drove a two-blade constant-speed propeller, which was intended to act as a dive brake during a dive bombing attack. The use of propeller braking was not entirely successful, and in practice US Navy Vindicators lowered the aircraft's undercarriage to act as a speed brake and dived at shallower angles. A single 1,000 lb (450 kg) bomb could be carried on a swinging trapeze to allow it to clear the propeller in a steep dive, while further bombs could be carried under the wings to give a maximum bombload of 1,500 lb (680 kg).

The SB2U was evaluated against the Brewster XSBA-1, Curtiss XSBC-3, Great Lakes XB2G-1, Grumman XSBF-1 and Northrop XBT-1. All but the Great Lakes and Grumman submissions were ordered into production. Designated XSB2U-1, one prototype was ordered on 15 October 1934 and was delivered on 15 April 1936. Accepted for operational evaluation on 2 July 1936, the prototype XSB2U-1, BuNo 9725, crashed on 20 August 1936. Its successful completion of trials led to further orders, with 56 SB2U-1s ordered on 26 October 1936, and a further 58 of a slightly modified version, the SB2U-2, on 6 October 1938.

The SB2U-3 was a more heavily modified version, intended as a long-range scout bomber, capable of being fitted with a conventional wheeled undercarriage, for operations from aircraft carriers or land airbases, or with floats. To give the required increased range, the fuselage fuel tank fitted to the SB2U-1 and -2 was supplemented by integral wing tanks, while the aircraft's tail had an increased span. The prototype XSB2U-3, converted from the last SB2U-1, flew in February 1939, and after testing as both a landplane and floatplane, 57 SB2U-3s were ordered on 25 September 1939, mainly for the US Marine Corps.

The SB2U is prominently featured in the 1941 film Dive Bomber.

There were 260 examples of all Vindicator variants produced, and a single example is preserved at the National Naval Aviation Museum at NAS Pensacola, Florida.

Operational history

U.S. Navy

Deliveries to the US Navy began in December 1937, when four aircraft joined VB-3 aboard the aircraft carrier , replacing Curtiss BFC-2 biplanes.

During the attack on Pearl Harbor, seven Vindicators from the U.S. squadron VMSB-231 were destroyed at Ewa Field.

U.S. Marine Corps
VMSB-131 and VMSB-241 were the only two USMC squadrons that fielded the Marine-specific SB2U-3 between March 1941 and September 1943. VMSB-241's Vindicators saw combat at the Battle of Midway in June 1942. Airmen with experience in more modern aircraft spoke disparagingly of SB2Us as "vibrators" or "wind indicators" in their later combat assignments. Captain Richard E. Fleming piloted a SB2U-3 Vindicator in an attack on the Japanese cruiser Mikuma on 5 June 1942, for which he was posthumously awarded the Medal of Honor.

French Navy
Based on the SB2U-2, the V-156-F incorporated specific French equipment. Briefly after the deliveries started in July 1939, V-156-F crews were trained for carrier operations aboard the French carrier , but when the war broke out the old carrier was declared too slow for operational service. As a result, V-156-F-equipped units escadrilles AB 1 and AB 3 were based ashore when the Battle of France started. AB 1 sustained heavy losses while attacking bridges and German ground targets in Northern France, as well as providing air cover for the  Evacuation of Dunkirk. AB 3's V-156-Fs were briefly engaged against the Italians, during which time they were credited with possibly sinking one submarine off Albenga. By the time of the Armistice, there were only a handful of remaining Voughts in French hands, and the type was phased out of service.

Royal Navy
France had placed an order for a further 50 V-156-Fs in March 1940, with delivery planned from March 1941. Following the defeat of France, this order was taken over by the British government for use by the Royal Navy's Fleet Air Arm, who named the aircraft the Chesapeake. The British required several modifications to the Chesapeake, including the additional fuel tank fitted to the SB2U-3, additional armor and heavier forward firing armament, with four rifle caliber machine guns replacing the single forward-firing Darne machine gun of the French aircraft. Fourteen Chesapeakes were used to equip a reformed 811 Naval Air Squadron on 14 July 1941 at RNAS Lee-on-Solent. The squadron, whose crews referred to it as the "cheesecake", intended to use them for anti-submarine patrols, and they were earmarked for the escort carrier .

By the end of October that year, it had been decided that the Chesapeakes were underpowered for the planned duties and would not be able to lift a sensible payload from the small escort carriers. Accordingly, they were withdrawn from 811 Squadron in November 1941 for use as training aircraft and the unit was re-equipped with the biplane Fairey Swordfish.

Variants
XSB2U-1
Single prototype, powered by a 750hp R-1535-78 engine.
SB2U-1
Initial production version powered by an 825hp R-1535-96 engine, 54 built.
SB2U-2
Same as SB2U-1 but with minor equipment changed, 58 built.
XSB2U-3
Single prototype of the extended-range version with twin floats, converted from the SB2U-1.
SB2U-3
Similar to the SB2U-2 but fitted with an 825hp R-1535-102 engine, crew armor and two 0.5in guns, 57 built
V-156F-3
Export version for the French Navy, 40 built.
V-156B-1
Export version similar to the SB2U-3 and powered by a 750hp R-1535-SB4-G engine for the British Royal Navy. Designated Chesapeake Mk.I; 50 built.
V-167
The V-156 company demonstrator was fitted with a more powerful Pratt & Whitney R-1830 engine and redesignated V-167. It remained a one-off.

Operators

 
French Navy Aeronavale
  
Royal Navy Fleet Air Arm
811 Naval Air Squadron
 
United States Navy
United States Marine Corps

Surviving aircraft
Only one known survivor exists today:
SB2U-2 Vindicator, Bureau Number 1383, is on display at the National Naval Aviation Museum at NAS Pensacola, Florida.

Specifications (SB2U-3)

See also

Notes

Bibliography
Brown, Eric, CBE, DCS, AFC, RN. with William Green and Gordon Swanborough. "Vought Chesapeake". Wings of the Navy, Flying Allied Carrier Aircraft of World War Two. London: Jane's Publishing Company, 1980, pp. 20–29. .
Doll, Tom. SB2U Vindicator in Action (Aircraft No. 122). Carrollton, Texas: Squadron/Signal Publications Inc., 1992. .
Green, William and Gordon Swanborough. "The Annals of Sugar Baker Two Uncle". Air Enthusiast, Eight, October 1978–January 1979. Bromley, UK:Fine Scroll. pp. 1–8, 74–79.

Mondey, David. The Hamlyn Concise Guide to American Aircraft of World War II. London: Chancellor Press, 1982. .

Taylor, John W. R. "SB2U Vindicator". Combat Aircraft of the World from 1909 to the Present. New York: G.P. Putnam's Sons, 1969. .
Thetford, Owen. British Naval Aircraft since 1912. London:Putnam, Fourth edition, 1978. .
Wixey, Ken. "'Flying Fuel Cans': Vought's SB2U Vindicator". Air Enthusiast, No. 86, March/April 2000. Stamford, UK:Key Publishing. pp. 62–69.

External links

SB2U page on Vought official website
V-156F page on Vought official website
AirToAirCombat.Com: Vought SB2U-1 Vindicator

SB02U
SBU2 Vindicator
Single-engined tractor aircraft
Low-wing aircraft
Carrier-based aircraft
World War II dive bombers of the United States
Aircraft first flown in 1936